In computability theory and mathematical logic the Tarski–Kuratowski algorithm is a non-deterministic algorithm that produces an upper bound for the complexity of a given formula in the arithmetical hierarchy and analytical hierarchy.

The algorithm is named after Alfred Tarski and Kazimierz Kuratowski.

Algorithm
The Tarski–Kuratowski algorithm for the arithmetical hierarchy consists of the following steps:
 Convert the formula to prenex normal form. (This is the non-deterministic part of the algorithm, as there may be more than one valid prenex normal form for the given formula.)
 Otherwise, count the number of alternations of quantifiers; call this k.

References
Rogers, Hartley The Theory of Recursive Functions and Effective Computability, MIT Press. ; 

Mathematical logic hierarchies
Computability theory
Theory of computation